Jesper Svenningsen (born 24 June 1997), better known as Zven (formerly Niels), is a Danish professional League of Legends player for Cloud9. He previously played for Team SoloMid, G2 Esports, Origen, and SK Gaming Prime.

He had played for Origen and finished at 2015 Worlds semifinals. Then he joined G2 in May 2016 along with Mithy, ahead of the 2016 EU LCS Summer split.  Zven joined Cloud9 for the 2020 LCS season wherein they won the Spring Split; Zven and Cloud9 won the 2021 Spring Split of the LCS as well. Zven was sent to the Cloud9 Academy team for the 2021 Summer Split. In 2022, he returned to the main roster, roleswapping to support after having played the role of botlaner for his entire career.

Tournament results

Origen
 3-4th — 2015 League of Legends World Championship
 2nd — 2016 EU LCS Spring

G2 Esports
 1st — 2016 Summer EU LCS regular season 
 1st — 2016 Summer EU LCS playoffs
 13–16th — 2016 League of Legends World Championship

Cloud9
 1st - 2020 Spring Split
 1st - 2021 Spring Split
 1st - 2022 Summer Split

References

G2 Esports players
Origen (esports) players
SK Gaming players
Danish esports players
1997 births
Living people
League of Legends AD Carry players
Cloud9 (esports) players